The Straight River is a tributary of the Fish Hook River,  long, in north-central Minnesota in the United States. The river is known as one of Minnesota's best trout fishing streams.

The river's name is a translation of the Ojibwe name for Straight Lake, through which the river flows near its source.

Geography
It flows initially southeastwardly, passing through Straight Lake, then east-southeastwardly into southwestern Hubbard County. The river flows in the Northern Lakes and Forests ecoregion, which is characterized by conifer and hardwood forests on flat and rolling till plains and outwash plains.

The Straight River is fed by springs which provide water cold enough to support an abundant trout population, and is known in sport fishing for catches of brown trout exceeding  in length. The river formerly supported a population of brook trout which declined due to rising water temperatures. In the early 1990s a group of organizations including Trout Unlimited sued the Minnesota Department of Natural Resources, seeking heightened protection of the Straight River; the department has since begun scrutinizing the irrigation activities of agricultural operations in the river's watershed, which may threaten the springs feeding cold water to the river.

Flow rate

See also
List of rivers in Minnesota

References

Rivers of Minnesota
Rivers of Becker County, Minnesota
Rivers of Hubbard County, Minnesota
Tributaries of the Mississippi River
Northern Minnesota trout streams